Al-Sarai Mosque, also known as Hasan Pasha Mosque or Al-Nasr li-Din Allah Mosque, is a historic Sunni Islamic mosque located in Baghdad, Iraq, in the south Al-Rusafa. The mosque was first laid by 34th Abbasid Caliph Al-Nasir in 1193 CE.

Description
The mosque is situated in front of Dar Diwani al-Hakumia, an administrative building during the Ottoman era, also known as a part of Qushla. Hasan Pasha, the wazir of Baghdad during the Ottoman era had overseen the expansion project during his office, and addition of several new facilities and features. During this time, ten additional domes, four central pillars in which there was no decorations or inscriptions, and a minaret with Qashani tiles were also added. Within the courtyard, there is a musholla (prayer space) for summer time, and at the left side there is a musholla for winter time. Within the mosque there is also a madrasa. There are five gates to the mosque, which all of them lead to the prayer space for congregational prayers such as jumuah and eid prayers.

Gallery

See also

 Islam in Iraq
 List of mosques in Iraq

References

13th-century mosques
Mosques in Baghdad
Sunni mosques in Iraq